Diego Alfredo Vallejos Hernández (born 16 March 1990) is a Chilean footballer who plays for Deportes Linares as a forward.

Honours

Club
Palestino
 Copa Chile (1): 2018

References

External links
 
 Diego Vallejos at playmakerstats.com (English version of ceroacero.es)

1990 births
Living people
People from Linares Province
Chilean footballers
Deportes Linares footballers
Audax Italiano footballers
Club Deportivo Universidad Católica footballers
Club Deportivo Palestino footballers
Curicó Unido footballers
Coquimbo Unido footballers
Santiago Wanderers footballers
Independiente de Cauquenes footballers
Segunda División Profesional de Chile players
Chilean Primera División players
Association football forwards